Mateo Sanabria (born 31 March 2004) is an Argentine footballer currently playing as a forward for Lanús. His nickname is "Caipirinha"

Club career
Due to a minor COVID-19 outbreak in the Lanús squad during pre-season, Sanabria was called up for first team training in January 2022.

Career statistics

Club

Notes

References

2004 births
Living people
People from Lomas de Zamora Partido
Footballers from Buenos Aires
Argentine footballers
Association football forwards
Club Atlético Lanús footballers